The Institute for Solar Physics is a Swedish research institute.  It is managed as an independent institute associated with Stockholm University through its Department of Astronomy. It is also a national research infrastructure under the Swedish Research Council.

The institute was first established in 1951 by the Royal Swedish Academy of Sciences as The Research Station for Astrophysics on the island of Capri, Italy. Around 1980 the station moved to La Palma in the Canary Islands. The new station is situated within the Spanish-International Observatory on the Roque de los Muchachos. It soon became obvious that the superior astronomical climate on La Palma called for a first-class solar telescope. The 47.5-cm Swedish Vacuum Solar Telescope, SVST, was erected in 1985.

During the nineties, the daily operations of the institute gradually moved from La Palma to Stockholm.

The SVST was removed from the tower on 28 August 2000 after almost 15 years of successful operations.  The SVST has been replaced with the Swedish 1-m Solar Telescope, which has twice as large aperture diameter.

In 2013, the institute was transferred from the Royal Swedish Academy of Sciences to its current home with Stockholm University.

External links 

 Institute for Solar Physics

Stockholm University
Royal Swedish Academy of Sciences
Astrophysics institutes